This a list of personnel numbers in the Royal Air Force, from its inception in 1918, up until the modern day. Royal Air Force staffing numbers have fluctuated with periodic demand, however, since the end of the Second World War, numbers have decreased steadily and the RAF itself has shrunk in terms of operating bases. Several schemes have been implemented during times of excess staffing to reduce numbers.

History
Several programmes were introduced over the life of the Royal Air Force with a view to either reducing, or increasing personnel in line with current threats, or loss of a perceived threat, such as after the First and Second World Wars. Other programmes were developed outside of conflict such as the Options for Change in 1990 (end of the Cold War), and the Defence Costs Study (or Front Line First) in 1994. Post First World War saw a huge reduction in staffing and aircraft, though recruitment did continue apace. One notable exception was the Women's Royal Air Force (WRAF) which was disbanded completely in 1920. At Armistice Day in 1918, the fledgling Royal Air Force consisted of a combined personnel of 291,170, which was expected to be reduced to 60,000 by 1 October 1919. In fact, by October 1919, the numbers had dropped to 58,000, increasing fears within the Air Force that it would cease to be an independent Air Force, and be subsumed into either the Navy or the Army. In 1925, the government announced plans to temporarily cease the expansion of the RAF, and it dropped in numbers between 1926 and 1927 from 33,500 to 33,009.

In response to German re-armament, particularly that of the Luftwaffe, an expansion of the RAF was announced in May 1935, stating a near trebling of aircraft and staff by the end of the next financial year (31 March 1937), resulting in an additional 22,500 personnel.

A re-assessment of necessary staffing after the end of the Cold War, prompted a Defence review called Options for Change. This scaled the Air Force at 75,000, having previously had a strength up to 1990 of 88,500. However, further cuts were implemented during 1993 which were not part of the original Options paper after natural wastage did not produce enough of a drop in numbers, and with the additional loss of one Tornado squadron in the meantime; estimates were recalculated to 70,000. Large swathes of redundancies were served upon all three strands of the UK military structure in 1995. This saw at least 9,000 redundancies, of which, 7,500 were in the Royal Air Force alone.

Full time personnel were offset in loss of numbers by the uplift of Reserve Personnel as per a government directive to increase the number of reservists. This can be seen by the increase of reservists, of which the percentage of reservists expanded two and half times over between October 2013 and October 2021.

Example personnel numbers

Notes

References

Sources

History of the Royal Air Force